Counterpart is an American science fiction thriller television series starring J. K. Simmons. It was created by Justin Marks and was first broadcast on the premium cable network Starz. The series ran for 20 episodes across two seasons. It premiered on December 10, 2017, and aired its final episode on February 17, 2019.

Premise
Howard Silk, a gentle, quiet office worker, has been working for a Berlin-based United Nations agency, the Office of Interchange (OI), for thirty years. His position is too low for him to be told what his work—exchanging apparently nonsensical messages—really involves. The OI oversees a checkpoint below its headquarters between parallel Earths (the "Alpha" and "Prime" worlds). The parallel Earths were created in 1987 during an experiment by East Germany when only a scientist named Yanek was on-site. The "Alpha world" Yanek met his "Prime world" counterpart, and they soon began studying how the initially identical Earths diverge.

The differences between the two worlds become more pronounced after 1996, when a flu pandemic killed hundreds of millions in the Prime world, setting back the world technologically but advancing it in life sciences. The virus was suspected of being purposely released by the Alpha world into the Prime world, which resulted in a tense cold war between the two worlds, with counterparts used as spies and sleeper agents. Silk's Alpha world continues to resemble ours, but the Prime world becomes quite different. Howard Silk Prime is a ruthless intelligence operative. Matters escalate during the series when a powerful rogue faction on Prime executes long-simmering plans to get revenge on Alpha.

Cast and characters

Main
 J. K. Simmons as Howard Silk, an Interface employee at the Alpha world's Office of Interchange (OI), and as Howard Silk Prime, an accomplished agent for Section 2 (clandestine operations) of OI in the Prime world
 Olivia Williams as Emily Burton-Silk, Howard's wife in the Alpha world and an employee of Housekeeping (the counterintelligence function) at OI, and as Emily Burton, Prime Howard's ex-wife and also an employee of OI Housekeeping
 Harry Lloyd as Peter Quayle, OI Director of Strategy in the Alpha world and Clare's husband
 Nazanin Boniadi as Clare, Peter Quayle's wife
 Sara Serraiocco as Nadia Fierro/Baldwin, a mysterious assassin from the Prime world
 Ulrich Thomsen as Josef Aldrich (season 1), OI Director of Housekeeping in the Alpha world
 Nicholas Pinnock as Ian Shaw, an aggressive OI Housekeeping operative and watchdog in the Prime world, and Emily Prime's lover after her marriage broke down
 Mido Hamada as Cyrus (season 1), an OI Housekeeping operative under Aldrich
 Betty Gabriel as Naya Temple (season 2), a former FBI agent hired by the OI in the Alpha world to clean house
 James Cromwell as Yanek (season 2), the warden of Echo, an underground facility in the Prime world, the scientist from Alpha in 1987 (played by Samuel Roukin) whose inattentive moment allowed an experiment to run amok and create Prime and the single corridor connecting the two worlds

Recurring
 Ken Duken as Spencer, Clare's childhood boyfriend and infiltrator from the Prime world
 Kenneth Choi as Bob Dwyer, OI Director of Strategy in the Prime world
 Guy Burnet as Claude Lambert, the Prime ambassador to the Alpha world, later revealed to have a close personal relationship with Claude (Alpha)
 Stephen Rea as Alexander Pope (season 1), Howard Prime's mentor and an influential associate of the Indigo program
 Bernhard Forcher as Andrei, Howard Alpha's friend and Go partner and Emily Alpha's lover
 Sarah Bolger as Anna Burton-Silk, Howard and Emily Prime's daughter
 Bjorn Johnson as Heinrich, an expatriate from the Prime world and part of Howard Prime's contact network
 Lotte Verbeek as Helen Mueller ("Ringleader"), one of a trio of infiltrators from the Prime world
 Karim Saleh as Marcel, an OI Interface employee in the Alpha world
 Richard Schiff as Roland Fancher, OI Director of Diplomacy and Quayle's father-in-law
 Nolan Gerard Funk as Angel Eyes, one of a trio of infiltrators from the Prime world
 Liv Lisa Fries as Greta, a barista in the Alpha world who becomes involved with Baldwin
 Jacqueline Bisset as Charlotte Burton, Emily's mother
 Christiane Paul as Mira, the head of the Indigo program's school in the Prime world, daughter of Yanek, and briefly appears as Mira (Alpha)
 Stefan Kapičić as Lieber, Ian Shaw's right-hand man
 Jacqueline Antaramian as Ava Fancher, Roland's wife
 Ingo Rademacher as Friedrich, Quayle's best friend
 Marco Khan as Raash, Howard Prime's right-hand man, a loyal and reliable operative

Episodes
<onlyinclude>

Season 1 (2017–18)

Season 2 (2018–19)

Notes

Production
The series was ordered in April 2015 with J. K. Simmons announced to star. Production began in December 2016 in Los Angeles. The series would also be filmed in additional locations across the U.S. and Europe in 2017, including Berlin, where the series is set, and in Potsdam at Babelsberg Studio, which co-produced the series. Amy Berg served as showrunner, executive producer, and writer for the first season, but departed before season two. While the reasons for her departure were never publicly stated, Berg implied it was due to conflicts with creator Marks who wanted full control of the series and to be the sole showrunner. Production began on the second season in February 2018 in Berlin. After Starz opted not to order more episodes, the series' production company Media Rights Capital sought another home for the show. The effort was not successful.

Reception

Critical response
Counterpart was well received by critics. The first season has a "certified fresh" 100% approval rating on Rotten Tomatoes with an average rating of 8.4 out of 10 based on 48 reviews. The site's critical consensus reads, "Tense and gripping, Counterpart is an absorbing thrill-fest led by J. K. Simmons' multi-faceted dual lead performance." On Metacritic, the first season has a score of 76 out of 100 based on 15 critics, indicating "generally favorable reviews".

The second season also received positive reviews. On Rotten Tomatoes, it has a 100% approval rating with an average rating 8 out of 10 based on 22 reviews. The site's critical consensus reads, "Double the J.K. Simmons brings double the aplomb in the second season of Counterpart, which finds time to deliver relevant societal critiques while deepening its labyrinthine lore." On Metacritic, it has a score of 75 out of 100 based on 7 critics, indicating "generally favorable reviews". Alan Sepinwall of Rolling Stone was less favorable with the second season and noted how the series had become too convoluted and difficult to follow.

Ratings

Season 1

Season 2

Accolades

Home media
The first season was released on Blu-ray and DVD on July 31, 2018, in region 1. The set includes all 10 episodes plus two behind-the-scenes featurettes.

References

External links
 

2017 American television series debuts
2019 American television series endings
2010s American drama television series
2010s American science fiction television series
American spy thriller television series
English-language television shows
Espionage television series
Starz original programming
Television series about parallel universes
Television series by Anonymous Content
Television series by Media Rights Capital
Television series by Sony Pictures Television
Television shows filmed in Los Angeles
Television shows set in Berlin